Blou may refer to:

People
 Juliana Blou (born 1995), Namibian football player

Places
 Blou, Maine-et-Loire, France

Other
 Blou (band), Canadian band